Taylor Preparatory High School or for short, Taylor Prep is a charter high school located in Taylor, Michigan in Metro Detroit serving grades 9-12th. It has 422 students. It was announced in early 2013 by PrepNet schools after the closed St. Alfred Catholic School was sold by the Archdiocese of Detroit to the company after the elementary was closed  in 2011. The school was opened in fall of 2013 under the leadership of Aquan Miles as the schools principal. As of late 2020, the school is now owned and operated by National Heritage Academies.

As of fall of 2019 the school offers an early college program in partnership with the Wayne County Community College District.

History
Taylor Preparatory High School was opened in fall of 2013 by PrepNet schools. The school was founded after the St. Alfred Catholic School was closed in 2011 and the building was later sold in 2013 by the Archdiocese of Detroit after being operational since 1946. After the building was sold the hallways connecting to the main church hall of St. Alfred Catholic Church were walled off; however, the two buildings remain structurally attached. 

PrepNet has since merged with National Heritage Academies in late 2020. Taylor Prep is now owned operated by National Heritage Academies.

Athletics 
The following sports are offered at Taylor Prep.  Unless noted there are teams for both sexes:
Baseball (boys)
Basketball
Cross Country
Soccer
Softball (girls)
Volleyball (girls)

Clubs

 Ladies FIRST
 REAL Men
 Spanish Club
Drama Club

Organizations
Homecoming
 Prom
 Student Council
 Yearbook
 National Honor Society
 Newspaper

Notable alumni
Jon Sabuda, Baseball player at Schoolcraft College 
Lauren Bergeron, PhD Student at University of Chicago

See also
National Heritage Academies
Arbor Preparatory High School
Wellspring Preparatory High School

References

External links

Public high schools in Michigan
Schools in Wayne County, Michigan
Educational institutions established in 2013
2013 establishments in Michigan
Taylor, Michigan